Sharpe's Honour is a 1994 British television drama, the fifth of a series screened on the ITV network that follows the career of Richard Sharpe, a fictional British soldier during the Napoleonic Wars. It is based on the 1985 novel of the same name by Bernard Cornwell.

Plot

In 1813, Napoleon is reeling from his disastrous invasion of Russia the year before, and Lord Wellington is preparing to drive the French out of Spain. Richard Sharpe (Sean Bean) is mourning the death of his wife Teresa.

Sharpe's archenemy, French Major Ducos (Feodor Atkine), proposes a plan to his emperor to split the alliance between Spain and England (and gain revenge on Sharpe). He has a French spy, la Marquesa (Alice Krige), write a letter to her Spanish husband claiming that Sharpe tried to force his unwanted attentions on her. Sharpe is forced into a duel with the outraged nobleman, but the fight is broken up by Wellington's men. Later that night, while he is sleeping, the Spaniard has his throat cut by El Matarife (Matthew Scurfield), a partisan leader. Sharpe is framed for the murder and is sentenced to hang. To placate his Spanish allies, Wellington is forced to go along.

Major Nairn (Michael Byrne), Wellington's spymaster, arranges for another condemned soldier to be executed (keeping spectators at a distance so the switch can remain undetected), while he sends Sharpe and Sergeant Harper (Daragh O'Malley) to find out what is going on. Meanwhile, Father Hacha (Nickolas Grace) and his brother El Matarife, Ducos' co-conspirators, abduct la Marquesa and imprison her in a nunnery to tie up loose ends. Sharpe learns of this and frees her, only to be chased by El Matarife and his men.

Sharpe is captured by a French patrol and taken to Ducos. The gloating Frenchman tells Sharpe that his duel and the murder of the nobleman has made it possible to negotiate a vital peace treaty with King Ferdinand VII of Spain; the British army will be forced to leave the country. Harper and the rest of Sharpe's "chosen men" infiltrate the French prison in disguise and rescue their commander, just in time for him to play a pivotal role in the British victory at the Battle of Vitoria. Sharpe finds El Matarife at the end of the battle, fights him man to man, and forces him to confess in front of Spanish and British witnesses. El Matarife then tries to stab Sharpe in the back, but is shot by a Spanish major, who now clearly believes Sharpe. With his plot in ruins, Ducos kills Father Hacha.

In his attempt to flee from the advancing British, the arrogant Ducos is hauled from his horse by the routed French soldiers and is shot and left to die (but survives to bedevil Sharpe in the future).

Cast
 Sean Bean as Richard Sharpe
 Daragh O'Malley as Sergeant Patrick Harper
 Hugh Fraser as Lord Wellington
 Michael Byrne as Major Nairn
 Alice Krige as La Marquesa
 Féodor Atkine as Major Pierre Ducos 
 Nickolas Grace as Father Hacha 
 Michael Mears as Rifleman Francis Cooper
 John Tams as Rifleman Daniel Hagman
 Jason Salkey as Rifleman Harris
 Lyndon Davies as Rifleman Perkins
 Ron Cook as Napoleon 
 Matthew Scurfield as El Matarife 
 Diana Perez as Ramona 
 Ricardo Vélez as Major Mendora 
 Jay Benedict as General Verigny 
 James Saxon as Major Vaughan 
 Anna Savva as Mother Superior 
 Mark Burns as General Pakenham 
 Christopher Owen as Rev. Whistler 
 Ricardo Montez as Father Sanchez 
 Benjamin Soames as Trumper Jones 
 Edward Atterton as Capt. Peter D'Alembord

References

External links
 
 Sharpe's Honour at SharpeFilm.com

1994 British television episodes
1990s historical films
1990s war films
Films based on British novels
Films based on historical novels
Films based on military novels
Napoleonic Wars films
Honour
War television films
Cultural depictions of Arthur Wellesley, 1st Duke of Wellington
Cultural depictions of Napoleon
Fiction set in 1813
Films directed by Tom Clegg (director)
Films about capital punishment